The 1960 National League was the 26th season and the fifteenth post-war season of the highest tier of motorcycle speedway in Great Britain.

Summary
The number of competitors increased from nine to ten with New Cross Rangers returning after a seven-year absence, and Ipswich Witches returning after one year away replacing Poole Pirates who moved down to the newly formed Provincial League.

Wimbledon Dons won their sixth title in just seven years.

Derek 'Tink' Maynard of the Belle Vue Aces was fatally injured in a crash at The Firs Stadium, on 23 July 1960. Maynard was competing in the second leg of the National Trophy against Norwich when Slant Payling lost control of his bike and it hit Maynard. Both riders were taken to Norwich Hospital but Maynard died the following morning.

Final table

Top Ten Riders (League only)

National Trophy
The 1960 National Trophy was the 22nd edition of the Knockout Cup. Wimbledon were the winners.

First round

Second round

Semifinals

Final

First leg

Second leg

Wimbledon were National Trophy Champions, winning on aggregate 115–101.

See also
 List of United Kingdom Speedway League Champions
 Knockout Cup (speedway)

References

Speedway National League
1960 in speedway
1960 in British motorsport